The Atlantic Nuclear Power Plant was a proposed floating nuclear power plant located off the coast of New Jersey. It was proposed in the 1970s by the Public Service Electric and Gas Company. Two Westinghouse 1,150 MWe (net) pressurized water reactors were ordered in 1972, and another two Westinghouse 1,150 MWe (net) reactors were ordered in 1973. The four unit power plant proposal was canceled in 1978.

The islands themselves and the massive concrete breakwaters would be built in a factory on Blount Island near Jacksonville, Florida; they would then be floated by ship to the plant site. The plants were first envisioned in 1969 by an engineer at PSE&G and the reactors were ordered in 1972 for operation starting in the mid-1980s. However, due to increasing costs and environmental protests, the plants were canceled in 1978.

See also

Floating nuclear power station

References

External links
Cancelled Nuclear Units Ordered in the United States

Popular Science Dec 1972 via Google Books
The Proposal for a Floating Nuclear Powerplant in the Mid-Atlantic (see page 197)

Cancelled nuclear power stations in the United States
Nuclear power plants in New Jersey
Buildings and structures in Ocean County, New Jersey
Public Service Enterprise Group